The 12889 / 12890 Tatanagar–SMVT Bengaluru Weekly Superfast Express is a Superfast Express train belonging to South Eastern Railway zone that runs between  and  in India. It is currently being operated on a weekly basis.

Service

It received New LHB coach from 11 April 2019. The Train 12889 Tatanagar – SMVT Bengaluru Superfast Express started to Terminate at the new Sir. M. Visvesvaraya Terminal, Bengaluru from 15 July 2022 instead of earlier Yesvantpur Junction. Similarly, Train 12890 SMVT Bengaluru – Tatanagar Superfast Express started its journey from the new Sir. M. Visvesvaraya Terminal, Bengaluru instead of earlier Yesvantpur Junction with effective from 18 July 2022.

Route and halts 

The important halts of the train are:

 
 
 
 
 
 Samalkot
 Rajahmundry
 Eluru

Coach composition

The train has modern LHB rakes with a max speed of 110 kmph. The train consists of 18 coaches:

 1 AC II Tier
 5 AC III Tier
 8 Sleeper coaches
 2 Second Class
 2 EOG (End on Generation)

Traction

From Tatanagar to Visakhapatnam Junction, it is hauled by Tatanagar Based WAP 7 And from Visakhapatnam Junction To Sir M. Visvesvaraya Terminal by Lallaguda based WAP 7 .

Rake sharing

The train shared its rake with 18103/18104 Tatanagar–Amritsar Jallianwalla Bagh Express

Timing 

12889 – starts Tatanagar Junction every Friday at 6:35 PM and reaches Yesvantpur Junction on 3rd day at 3:35 AM IST
12890 – starts Yesvantpur Junction every Monday at 8:30 AM and reaches Tatanagar Junction on 2nd day at 5:25 PM IST

See also 

 Tatanagar Junction Railway Station
 Sir M. Visvesvaraya Terminal Railway Station 

 Jallianwalla Bagh Express
 Tatanagar–Amritsar Jallianwalla Bagh Express

References 
Notes

Sources

External links 
 12889/Tatanagar - Yesvantpur Superfast Express India Rail Info
 12890/Yesvantpur - Tatanagar Superfast Express India Rail Info

Transport in Jamshedpur
Transport in Bangalore
Express trains in India
Rail transport in Jharkhand
Rail transport in Odisha
Rail transport in Andhra Pradesh
Rail transport in Tamil Nadu
Rail transport in Karnataka
Railway services introduced in 2003